Taccjana Michajlaŭna Ivínskaja (born 27 March 1958 in Vitebsk, Belarusian SSR) is a Belarusian former basketball player who competed in the 1980 Summer Olympics.

References

1958 births
Living people
Belarusian women's basketball players
Olympic basketball players of the Soviet Union
Basketball players at the 1980 Summer Olympics
Olympic gold medalists for the Soviet Union
Olympic medalists in basketball
Sportspeople from Vitebsk
Soviet women's basketball players
Medalists at the 1980 Summer Olympics